Sudarshan may refer to:

People
 Hanumappa Sudarshan, Right Livelihood and Padma Shri award winner, known for his work with the Soliga tribes of Karnataka, India
 George Sudarshan, a prominent Indian American physicist, author, and professor at the University of Texas at Austin
 K. S. Sudarshan, a leader of the Rashtriya Swayamsevak Sangh (RSS), a Hindu nationalist organization of India
 R. N. Sudarshan (1939-2017), Indian film actor and producer
 Sudarshan Agarwal, a governor of the state of Uttarakhand, India
 Sudarshan Devanesen, an Indo-Canadian family physician and educator, public health activist, and member of the Order of Canada
 Sudarshan Kapoor, professor, author of Raising up a Prophet (1992)
 Sudarshan Mahasthavir, a Nepalese Buddhist monk and author

Other uses
 Sudarshan laser-guided bomb, a laser-guided bomb built by DRDO, India
 Sudarshana Chakra, a legendary spinning disc like weapon used by the Hindu god Vishnu
 Sudarshan (magazine), Gujarati language magazine founded by Indian writer Manilal Dwivedi